Crank is a 2006 American action film written and directed by Mark Neveldine and Brian Taylor (in their directorial debuts) and starring Jason Statham, Amy Smart and Jose Pablo Cantillo. English hitman Chev Chelios is based in Los Angeles, is poisoned by the mafia and must keep his adrenaline flowing constantly in order to keep himself alive, while he tries to track down the man who poisoned him. The title of the film comes from a slang word for methamphetamine.

The film was followed by a sequel titled Crank: High Voltage in 2009.

Plot
Los Angeles-based British hitman Chev Chelios works for a crime syndicate led by Don "Carlito" Carlos. Chelios is contracted by Carlito to kill mafia boss Don Kim as members of the Triads have been encroaching on Carlito's business. Chelios goes to Don Kim and apparently murders him.

In the confusion, ambitious small-time criminal Ricky Verona uses the opportunity to conspire with Carlito against Chelios: Verona will kill Chelios so the Triads do not retaliate, and then take Chelios's place as Carlito's new hired gun. The morning after Don Kim's death, while Chelios sleeps in his apartment, Verona, his brother Alex, and several henchmen break in and inject Chelios with a Chinese synthetic drug which inhibits the flow of adrenaline, slowing the heart and eventually killing the victim. Chelios wakes to find a recording left by Verona showing what he has done. Furious, Chelios smashes his TV and heads out.

Chelios phones Mafia surgeon Doc Miles, who informs Chelios that to survive he must keep his adrenaline pumping through constant excitement and danger, and he is unsure if the antidote exists. Chelios keeps his adrenaline up through risky and dangerous acts, which include picking fights with other gangsters, reckless driving and motorcycling, taking illegal drugs and synthetic epinephrine, fighting with the police, and having public sex with his girlfriend Eve.

Chelios visits Carlito at his penthouse and asks him to help find an antidote, as well as to find and kill Verona and his crew. Carlito says there is no antidote and only confirms that Carlito and Verona are working together. Carlito tells Chelios how he will use his death as a scapegoat against the Chinese. An angered Chelios leaves Carlito's penthouse to find Verona. Through Chelios' street contact, a transvestite named Kaylo, he finds Alex at a restaurant and unsuccessfully interrogates him about his brother's whereabouts before killing him. Chelios phones Verona through Alex's phone and tells him of his brother's death, prompting Verona to send thugs after Eve as a revenge. Chelios rushes to pick up Eve before Verona's thugs get to her. Chelios reveals his true profession to her and that he was planning to retire to spend more time with her.

Kaylo, who has been kidnapped by Carlito's men, is forced to call Chelios and tell him that Verona is at a Triad warehouse. Chelios goes there, finding Kaylo's corpse and the henchmen. They reveal that Carlito ordered them to kill Chelios. Eve, who has followed Chelios, unexpectedly arrives, but then escapes with Chelios after a shootout with Carlito's henchmen. Chelios and Eve go to Doc Miles's place, where Miles explains that he cannot cure Chelios. Knowing that he will die soon, Chelios decides to take his revenge on Verona and arranges a meeting with him at a downtown hotel.

Chelios goes to the rooftop of the hotel and meets with Verona, Carlito, and his henchmen. Carlito takes out a syringe, filled with the same poison used by Verona. As he is about to kill Chelios by injecting the second dose into him, Don Kim, revealed to be alive as Chelios spared him after all, arrives with his Triads to assist Chelios and a shootout follows. During the battle, several of Don Kim's and all of Carlito's men are killed. Carlito tries to escape with his private helicopter, but Chelios manages to catch up to him and holds him at gunpoint. Before Chelios can kill Carlito, Verona sneaks behind and injects Chelios with the syringe, after which Chelios collapses. Carlito himself is betrayed by Verona, who shoots him dead and tries to escape with his helicopter.

Chelios manages to stand up, boards the helicopter, and engages in a fight with Verona. After some struggle, Chelios manages to pull Verona out of the helicopter and while mid-air, Chelios proceeds to snap Verona's neck, killing him. While falling, Chelios calls Eve on his cell phone to apologize for not coming back. Chelios hits a car, bounces off it and lands right in front of the camera. In the last shot, it is implied that his adrenaline is indeed still flowing fast; his nostrils flare, he blinks, and two heartbeats are heard.

Cast
 Jason Statham as Chev Chelios
 Amy Smart as Eve Lydon 
 Jose Pablo Cantillo as Ricky Verona 
 Carlos Sanz as Carlito
 Dwight Yoakam as Doc Miles 
 Efren Ramirez as Kaylo 
 Keone Young as Don Kim 
 Reno Wilson as Orlando
 Sam Witwer as Henchman
 Jay Xcala as Alex Verona
 Chester Bennington as Pharmacy stoner (cameo)
 Glenn Howerton as Doctor
 Noel Gugliemi as Warehouse Rooftop Hood

Production
The film was written in 2003 with Johnny Knoxville in mind for the lead role.

Rather than being shot on 35mm film like most films at the time, the filmmakers of Crank opted to shoot on digital videotape, using Canon XL2 and Sony CineAlta HDC-F950 cameras.

The film was shot on location in Los Angeles. Co-directors Mark Neveldine and Brian Taylor operated both "a" and "b" cameras, where one would get a wide shot and the other would get a close-up shot. Jason Statham did all of his own fight and car stunts, including the fight with Verona in a helicopter 3,000 feet above Los Angeles.

Music
The soundtrack for the film was released on August 22, 2006. Allmusic gave the album three out of five, stating "What is here is imaginative, creative, and head-scratchingly cool. While it's a very tacky and overly obvious thing indeed to end with the Jefferson Starship tune 'Miracles' (why not just give away the ending, huh?), this set is pretty much unassailable."

Marketing
Directors Neveldine and Taylor, along with actors Statham and Ramirez, appeared at the 2006 Comic-Con Convention in San Diego, California. The panel showed a short clip and promoted the film, mentioning that it was shot in HD and that no wires or CGI were used for the stunt scenes.

The filmmakers also made extensive use of web advertisement to promote the film. Lionsgate bought a featured spot on the home page of YouTube and paid several of its well-known members to advertise.

Reception

Box office
Crank opened on September 1, 2006 in North America in 2,515 theaters. It grossed $10,457,367 on its opening weekend and was ranked at No. 2 at the box office, behind Invincible. The film ended up grossing $27,838,408 domestically and $15,092,633 internationally for a total of $42,931,041, on a $12 million production budget.

Critical response
On Rotten Tomatoes the film holds an approval rating of 62% based on 99 reviews, with an average rating of 6.10/10. The website's consensus for the film reads, "Crank assaultive style and gleeful depravity may turn off casual action fans, but audiences seeking a strong dose of adrenaline will be thrilled by Jason Statham's raucous race against mortality." On Metacritic the film has a weighted average score of 57 out of 100 based on 19 critics, indicating "mixed or average reviews". Audiences surveyed by CinemaScore gave the film an average grade "C+" on an A+ to F scale. 

Lionsgate chose not to screen the film for critics or the press prior to its theatrical release. Some filmmakers and actors singled out Crank (and its sequel) among their favorite Statham films, including Seth Rogen, Rupert Grint, Simon Pegg, James McAvoy, Edgar Wright, and Gareth Evans.

Home media

The region 2 version of the DVD was released December 26, 2006, but initially had no special features. The region 1 DVD was released by Lionsgate on January 9, 2007. This DVD is available in separate widescreen and fullscreen editions, each with Dolby Digital 5.1 and 2.0 tracks. The bonus materials includes running cast and crew audio commentary, behind-the-scenes footage, gags, maps, making-of insights, and interviews with the cast. These features are all accessible via the "Crank'd Out Mode" - a pop-up window feature that allows access to the extras without ever leaving the film. The DVD also includes a "family friendly" audio replacement, in which the film is dubbed over as it would appear on a television broadcast. However, the violence, language subtitles, and nudity are still the same.

Video games
A J2ME game was developed by Silverbirch Studios.

Sequel

Crank: High Voltage is the 2009 sequel to Crank. It picks up seconds after the first film left off. It seems that the poison in Chelios' body has worn off, but retains the gimmick of the first installment; he now has an artificial heart which he must keep charged with electricity to stay alive.

References

External links

 
 
 
 
 
 

2006 films
2000s English-language films
2006 action thriller films
American action thriller films
Films about contract killing
Films about drugs
Films about organized crime in the United States
Films directed by Neveldine/Taylor
Films produced by Gary Lucchesi
Films produced by Tom Rosenberg
Films set in Los Angeles
Films shot in Los Angeles
Lakeshore Entertainment films
Lionsgate films
Films scored by Paul Haslinger
2006 directorial debut films
Triad films
2000s American films
2000s Hong Kong films